Buddy of the Legion is an American animated short film, released April 6, 1935. It is a Looney Tunes cartoon, featuring Buddy, the second star of the series. It was directed by Ben Hardaway; Bernard Brown was musical director. Notably, this is Chuck Jones's first credit as animator on a Warner Bros. cartoon. The short Buddy of the Legion was first shown at the State Theatre in Winona, Minnesota.

Summary
Buddy whistles merrily along a sidewalk, quickly coming to a bookstore with a sign reading "Boy wanted" in the window. Taking the sign, he strolls in to find the proprietor of the shop, a matronly lady, busily invested in her work and inattentive of the young man's presence. Clearing his throat, Our Hero makes himself and his intentions known to the woman. The woman, after a brief inspection of the candidate, hires Buddy to dust the store. Getting right to work, Buddy dusts everything he sees. His boss, leaving, orders him to watch the store while she is away and to put away all of the books left on the table. No sooner has the boss lady left than Buddy is attempting to fit in his grasp about a dozen books at once! A fly causes Buddy to lose his balance, crash into a stove, and drop every volume. One of the books, now open to him, tells of life in the Foreign Legion, and Buddy becomes so engrossed in reading that he forgets the tasks assigned him and sits down at a desk, where he daydreams about Amazons, such as the book describes.

Our Hero is now the leader of a detachment of the Legion, marching through the desert, singing "Arabia." After the musical number, we come to a fortress controlled by Amazons (as the flag above the building makes clear). Within, large women force smaller, captive Legion soldiers to do chores. One pushes a quern-stone and one washes laundry with water provided by a wheel turned by the efforts of a third man, who, for his lazy walking, is prodded by a projectile emitted by the hookah of the Amazon leader. One Amazon, looking through a spy-glass, sees the legionnaires, and announces their coming to the leader. The leader calls for an attractive genie woman. The genie travels, by magic carpet, into the path of the Legion.

Dancing seductively, the genie eventually manages to turn the heads of all the soldiers, save trumpeter Buddy; all are led away to their enslavement. Buddy faces about, ordering the company to halt. Realizing that his men are gone, Buddy runs off into the distance. The soldiers, in their trance, are brought into the Amazon fortress. As each man enters, the Amazon leader knocks him aside. One legionnaire, wearing spectacles, indicates his proclivity. The Amazon simply removes his glasses, and then lands her blow.

Legionnaire Buddy, having found the fortress, steps through the same threshold, but the Amazon's fist misses him, as he is quite a bit shorter than the other soldiers. Our Hero runs about, avoiding swords, and causing the warrior-women to chase him. One Amazon finds herself trapped in what may be a laundry chute, and several others are knocked clear into the sky by a water vessel spinning atop a well. Then, another Amazon emerges from the same well, shaking Buddy from behind. Buddy awakens, and it turns that his new adversary is none other than his boss, who has returned to her shop. Dragged by the collar, Buddy is, unceremoniously but obligingly, ejected from the store: "Okey-dokey!" he calls back.

Joe Penner
This marks the second time that a Buddy cartoon sports a reference to Joe Penner. A camel, belonging to a distracted legionnaire, is pulled by the tail, to which treatment it responds: "Don't ever DO that!" A similar joke occurs in Buddy's Adventures.

Use of thorn (Þ)
Another similarity that this short bears to Buddy's Adventures is the use of the definite article "Ye," phonetically identical to "The"; the "Y" is a convenient replacement for the originally Old English glyph Þ, called "thorn." In Buddy of the Legion, the article is found in the name of the bookstore: "Ye Olde Book Shoppe."

References

External links
 
 

1935 films
1935 animated films
1930s American animated films
1930s animated short films
American black-and-white films
Bookstores in fiction
Films scored by Bernard B. Brown
Films scored by Norman Spencer (composer)
Films directed by Ben Hardaway
Buddy (Looney Tunes) films
Films set in deserts
French Foreign Legion in popular culture
Genies in film
Looney Tunes shorts